The 2023 New Orleans Privateers baseball team represents the University of New Orleans during the 2023 NCAA Division I baseball season. The Privateers play their home games at Maestri Field at Privateer Park and are led by eighth–year head coach Blake Dean. They are members of the Southland Conference.

Preseason

Southland Conference Coaches Poll
The Southland Conference Coaches Poll was released on February 3, 2023. New Orleans was picked to finish fourth in the Southland Conference with 87 votes.

Preseason All-Southland team
Four New Orleans players were named to the conference preseason second team.

First Team
Edgar Alvarez (NICH, JR, 1st Base)
Brad Burckel  (MCNS, SR, 2nd Base)
Josh Leslie (MCNS, SR, 3rd Base)
Parker Coddou (NICH, JR, Shortstop)
Bo Willis (NWST, JR, Catcher)
Tre Jones (TAMUCC, JR, Designated Hitter)
Payton Harden (MCNS, SR, Outfielder)
Brendan Ryan (TAMUCC, SR, Outfielder)
Xane Washington (NICH, R-SR, Outfielder)
Zach Garcia  (TAMUCC, SO, Starting Pitcher)
Grant Rogers (MCNS, JR, Starting Pitcher)
Tyler Theriot (NICH, SR, Starting Pitcher)
Burrell Jones (MCNS, SR, Relief Pitcher)
Alec Carr (UIW, SR, Utility)

Second Team
Josh Blankenship (LU, SR, 1st Base)
Daunte Stuart (NWST, JR, 2nd Base)
Kasten Furr (NO, JR, 3rd Base)
Tyler Bischke (NO, JR, Shortstop)
Bryce Grizzaffi (SELA, SR, Catcher)
Kade Hunter (MCNS, SR, Designated Hitter)
Josh Caraway (TAMUCC, JR, Outfielder)
Braden Duhon (MCNS, JR, Outfielder)
Issac Williams (NO, JR, Outfielder)
Cal Carver  (NWST, SR, Starting Pitcher)
Tyler LeBlanc (NO, JR, Starting Pitcher)
Will Kinzeler (SELA, JR, Starting Pitcher)
Dalton Aspholm (SELA, SR, Relief Pitcher)
Tre’ Obregon III (MCNS, SR, Utility)

Personnel

Schedule and results

References

New Orleans Privateers
New Orleans Privateers baseball seasons
New Orleans Privateers baseball